"Walkaway Joe" is a song written by Vince Melamed and Greg Barnhill, and recorded by American country music singer Trisha Yearwood, with background vocals from Don Henley of the Eagles. It was released in November 1992 as the second single from her album Hearts in Armor. The song reached number 2 on the U.S. Billboard country charts. Matthew McConaughey appears as the male lead in the music video.

Content
"Walkaway Joe" is a mid-tempo ballad describing a failed relationship initiated by an over-eager 17-year-old girl ("Such are the dreams of an average Jane / Ninety miles an hour down lovers' lane") and an uninterested male (presumably embarking on a life of crime, as evidenced in the song's second verse), or "Walkaway Joe."

After a performance on The Tonight Show, Yearwood met Don Henley of the Eagles and, after being invited to sing on her second album, he traveled to Nashville, Tennessee and recorded background vocals for the song.

Matthew McConaughey appears in the music video.

The song appeared in the CBS show Touched by an Angel. Episode 512 of the show entitled "Fool For Love" was based on the song.

Critical reception
Thom Jurek described the song favorably in his review of Hearts in Armor, saying, "Yearwood's telling the story she tells best, working-class love gone bad." In a review of Yearwood's 1997 greatest-hits package (Songbook) A Collection of Hits, Gordon Ely of the Richmond Times said, "It's not just a great song. It's memorable and only a shade shy of pure poetry. And it will be with us for a long time."

The song was nominated for Best Country Vocal Performance, Female at the 1994 Grammy Awards.

Chart performance
"Walkaway Joe" debuted at number 60 on the U.S. Billboard Hot Country Singles & Tracks for the week of November 7, 1992.

Year-end charts

References

1992 singles
Trisha Yearwood songs
Don Henley songs
Male–female vocal duets
Songs written by Vince Melamed
Song recordings produced by Garth Fundis
MCA Records singles
1992 songs
Songs written by Greg Barnhill